Pseudographis may refer to:
 Pseudographis, a genus of molluscs, synonym of Kejdonia
 Pseudographis (fungus), a genus of fungi